Konica Minolta OpenAPI is a proprietary API communication system that allows software application developers to create applications that communicate with Konica Minolta MFPs.

Technology
Konica Minolta OpenAPI is based around a SOAP/XML architecture, however a "wrapper" to abstract the SOAP messages is provided to allow developers to use the Microsoft .NET Framework instead.  The wrapper is also available for Mono, with no significant differences to the .NET wrapper.  The direct SOAP interface has also been used successfully from the Java language in commercial products and deployed on various other operating systems including Linux, OS X, Novell OES 2 and Windows.

Despite being a SOAP based technology, it differs from a traditional Open API in that it is for communication between an application and an MFPs rather than two web services. The application may be a web service, however this would be incidental only.

Name
Despite the name "Open API", it is a proprietary technology, and neither is it an Open Source system, nor is the SDK or a specification of the interface publicly available. It is only "open" in the sense that other companies may, under Konica Minolta's rules, develop applications that use it.

Supported Models
Konica Minolta OpenAPI supports most new Konica Minolta MFPs between the speeds of 20 and 75 pages per minute.  Not all models are supported, and different models have different levels of support for the API.  Despite this, a part of the API is able to query the supported functions and version levels available from the MFP and a stated goal of the API is to allow communication to multiple different devices, without the concern over their exact model - as such, backwards compatibility and conformity across the range is strongly emphasised.

Licensing model
Application developers wishing to use Konica Minolta OpenAPI should contact their local Konica Minolta office.  Different regions within the world have different license models for OpenAPI, ranging from "free, but unsupported - support with payment", to "only available at Konica Minolta's discretion".

References 

Konica Minolta products
Application programming interfaces